Li Ji slays the Giant Serpent (李寄斩蛇) is a Chinese tale. It was first published in the 4th century compilation named Soushen Ji, a collection of legends, short stories, and hearsay concerning Chinese gods, Chinese ghosts, and other supernatural phenomena. The collection is attributed to Chinese official Gan Bao (or Kan Pao).

Li Ji (or Li Chi) also appears as the character of "Chinese tales and ballads".

Alternate names
Alternate names for the tale are: 
 The Girl-Eating Serpent;
 Li Chi slays the Serpent;
 Li Ji slays the Great Serpent;
 Li Ji Hacks Down the Snake;
 Li Chi Slays the Great Serpent;
 Li Chi, the Serpent Slayer;
 Li Ji, the Serpent Slayer;
 The Serpent Sacrifice.

Synopsis
In the Yung (Yong) mountains, in the province of Fukien (or in another translation, in Eastern Yue, in Minzhong, or in the province of Minchung, in Tungyeh), there lived a serpent that demanded the sacrifice of maidens from the village below. Otherwise, if denied, the serpent would curse the town with all sorts of calamities. The town officials, afraid of the creature, give in to its horrible requests and send a maiden to the cave's opening (in one translation, the daughters of slaves and criminals). These sacrifices repeat eight more times, always during "the first week of the eighth lunar month".

One day, Li Ji (or Li Chi), the youngest daughter of Li Dan (or Li Tan), offers herself to be the sacrifice, since her mother and father have five other daughters and no son.

She goes to the mountains to face the serpent, armed with a sword and accompanied by a snake-biting dog. Li Ji puts a basket of sweet-smelling rice cakes to draw the serpent out of its hideout, and while it is distracted by the food, unleashes the dog on the animal. The serpent retreats to the cave, but the girl follows after it, always hitting and striking its body with the sword, until it dies. Li Ji sees the skeletons of the nine sacrificed maidens and either laments they were devoured or that they let themselves be devoured by the beast.

In some variations of the legend, the king learns of Li Ji's bravery and marries her. In another, the King of Dongyue marries her and rewards her father with a position of Magistrate of the Jiangle district. In a third translation, the King of Yüeh offers her father the position of governor of Chiang-lo.

Analysis
The tale shares similarities with tales about dragonslaying around the globe. However, in this tale, a serpent takes the place of the dragon. In fact, according to researcher Hugh R. Clark, ancient Chinese scholars once associated the culture of Min with snakes, which is further reinforced by the fact that folktales collected in Fujian show snakes as vicious enemies to be vanquished.

Some scholars interpret the tale as a contrast of Ji Li's bravery against the ineffectualness of the male village officers, who preferred to obey the serpent instead of trying to fight it.

The tale has also been interpreted under an anthropological lens: the snake would be linked to female sexuality and fertility.

It has also been suggested that the snake foe (a python with supernatural powers, in some accounts) may represent an old local deity with serpentine form, and the sacrifice of virginal maidens merits comparison to fertility rites. As a new belief system was being diffused through the country, the old animal-shaped divinities were subject to a process of religious reformation that demoted them to adversarial roles of the newcomer human-like deities. In the same vein, the tale could be related to a phenomenon researcher Wu Chunming named "suppression of the snake", brought about by "Sinnitic immigrants to the region".

Hugh R. Clark also identifies the tale as belonging to traditions from "the Min River valley" and, by extension, reflective of the Yue culture.

Professor Biwu Shang also cites another tale about serpent-slaying, “The Great Serpent”. According to him, in this tale of the zhiguai genre, a similarly named heroine Li Ji slays a human-killing serpent.

See also
 Dragonslayer (heroic archetype in fiction)
 Han E
 Hua Mulan
 List of women warriors in folklore
 Susanoo, slayer of eight-headed serpent Yamata no Orochi
 Nezha, opponent of Dragon Prince Ao Bing
 Chen Jinggu, slayer of the White Snake Demon; as well as The Divine Damsel of Devastation, a song inspired by Chen Jinggu and Li Ji's stories in Genshin Impact
 Sitonai, similar Ainu legend

Footnotes

References 

Fictional women soldiers and warriors
Chinese folklore
Women in Chinese mythology
Folklore
Short stories set in Fujian
Stories within Taiping Guangji